Ryan Smith is an American screenwriter and actor. He wrote 19 episodes of television's MADtv in the 2006-2007 season. As an actor, he made guest appearances on the program "Yes, Dear" and in the Mediocre Films shorts "Mating Season" (2005) and "Gorgeous Tiny Chicken Machine Show" (2007). In June 2008, Smith appeared in the web series Comedy Gumbo on Crackle.

External links
 

Year of birth missing (living people)
Living people
American television writers
American male television writers